Wyoming Highway 231 (WYO 231) is a  state highway in southeastern Lincoln County, Wyoming that serves as the main street of the town of Cokeville.

Route description
Wyoming Highway 231 is a 1/2 mile long spur of US 30 locally known as E. Main Street. Highway 231's western terminus is at Collette Avenue (CR 207) which provides access to Cokeville Municipal Airport (via CR 207 south). The east end of Highway 231 is at U.S. Route 30/Wyoming Highway 89 and the western terminus of WYO 232.

Major intersections

References
Official 2003 State Highway Map of Wyoming

External links

Wyoming Routes 200-299
WYO 231 - US-30/WYO 89/WYO 232 to Cokeville

Transportation in Lincoln County, Wyoming
231
State highways in the United States shorter than one mile